KTUU-TV (channel 2) is a television station in Anchorage, Alaska, United States, affiliated with NBC. It is owned by Gray Television alongside dual CBS/MyNetworkTV affiliate KAUU (channel 5). Both stations share studios on East 40th Avenue in midtown Anchorage, while KTUU-TV's transmitter is located in Knik, Alaska.

Some of KTUU-TV's programming is broadcast to rural communities via low-power translators through the Alaska Rural Communications Service (ARCS).

History

The construction permit for channel 2 in Anchorage was issued on July 29, 1953, to Keith Kiggins and Richard R. Rollins. The permit took the call sign KFIA ("First in Anchorage") and then began construction, with an antenna being placed atop the Westward Hotel at Third Avenue and F Street. The same day the FCC granted a construction permit for channel 2, it also greenlit Anchorage's channel 11, KTVA, sparking a race to be the first broadcast television station in the territory.

It appeared that KFIA was ahead when it announced it would broadcast its first test pattern on October 15, as KTVA was unpacking its equipment. However, it failed to put out a picture that night. Two days later, on the 17th, the first television test pattern in Alaska was broadcast, but the station missed its announced November 1 start date. Picture quality control equipment was late getting to Anchorage, pushing back the start date twice. It was only a month and a half later that KFIA made it on the air, on December 14, but in that time, it had lost its claim to be first in Anchorage with programming, as KTVA had signed on December 11. Both stations had also been beat by a cable system in Ketchikan to be the first source of television programming anywhere in the territory. When the station did get on the air, it did so "quietly and without fanfare", in the words of its general manager.

Midnight Sun Broadcasting (The Lathrop Company), owned by Alvin Oscar "Al" Bramstedt Sr. bought the station in 1954; the station's call letters were changed to KENI-TV in 1955; that year, it moved into the Fourth Avenue Theatre, also known as the Lathrop Building, downtown. Lathrop sold KENI-AM-TV plus its other radio and TV stations—KTKN in Ketchikan, KFAR-TV (now KATN)/FM in Fairbanks, and KINY-TV (now KJUD)-FM in Juneau—to All-Alaska Broadcasting Company, which later became Midnight Sun Broadcasters in 1960.

On September 19, 1966, channel 2 became the first station in Alaska to transmit in color when it aired the premiere episode of the ABC sitcom That Girl (entitled "Don't Just Do Something, Stand There!"). The station had joint primary affiliation with NBC and ABC (with KTVA picking up some of the slack) until October 1, 1967, when it switched to ABC primary and NBC secondary, primarily because ABC had more programs on film. Channel 2 became a full-time ABC affiliate in 1970 when KHAR (channel 13, now KYUR) took the NBC affiliation. The two stations switched networks in October 1971, at which time KHAR became KIMO. Channel 2 also carried a few PBS programs (particularly The Electric Company) until KAKM signed on in 1975. Until KTVF in Fairbanks switched networks from CBS to NBC in April 1996, KTUU was the only full-time NBC affiliate in Alaska, clearing every network program. On June 3, 1981, Midnight Sun Broadcasters sold the station to Zaser and Longston of Bellevue, Washington, who changed the call letters to the current KTUU-TV the next week on June 10 in conjunction with the sale.

In August 2010, KTUU became the third Schurz-owned television station (after KWCH-DT and KSCW-DT in Wichita, Kansas and WDBJ in Roanoke, Virginia) to relaunch its website through a new partnership with the Tribune Company's Tribune Interactive division. Previously, the Web address was operated by the local media division of World Now. The other Schurz television station websites, which were operated by Broadcast Interactive Media, also followed after their CMS contract with BIM ran out.

On November 9, 2013, KTUU-TV was dropped by GCI in 22 rural communities, after the two sides were unable to come to a new retransmission agreement, though GCI still carries some KTUU and NBC programming in some of these areas through the Alaska Rural Communications Service. The dispute did not involve areas (including Anchorage) where GCI carries KTUU through must-carry. The move followed the sale of rival KTVA to a subsidiary of GCI a week earlier, which KTUU had opposed over concerns that this move could be made. KTUU's channel slot on most of the affected systems was filled by Starz Kids & Family. Despite this dispute, KTUU extended its newscast carriage agreement with KATH-LD in Juneau and KSCT-LP in Sitka (which were also acquired by GCI at the same time it acquired KTVA) through November 22; that agreement was subsequently extended through December 6 as negotiations continued toward a long-term deal, but talks ultimately broke down, and by December 7 KATH/KSCT no longer aired KTUU programming. A deal between GCI and KTUU was finally reached on February 6, 2014; this allowed the station to return to GCI's rural systems (as well as separately-owned cable systems that receive KTUU through GCI) in time for NBC's broadcast of the 2014 Winter Olympics, as well as the eventual restoration of KTUU's newscasts to KATH/KSCT.

Schurz announced on September 14, 2015 that it would exit broadcasting and sell its television and radio stations, including KTUU-TV, to Gray Television for $442.5 million. Associated with the purchase, on October 1, 2015, it was announced that Gray would buy MyNetworkTV-affiliated KYES-TV for $500,000. The acquisition of KYES created the first legal duopoly in the market (KTBY and KYUR operate as a virtual duopoly). The FCC approved the Schurz sale on February 12, 2016; and the sale was completed on February 16. The KYES acquisition was completed on June 27, 2016; it had been approved on June 17 under the condition that KYES not affiliate with a network that would make that station one of the top-four stations in the Anchorage market.

News operation

KTUU presently broadcasts 22 hours, 25 minutes of locally produced newscasts each week (with 4 hours, 5 minutes each weekday and one hour each on Saturdays and Sundays). The two-hour weekday newscast Morning Edition, 6 p.m. hour, and 10 p.m. late newscast are simulcast with KAUU. A half-hour KTUU-exclusive newscast airs at 5 p.m., followed by the NBC Nightly News at 5:30 p.m. All newscasts are branded as Alaska's News Source, KTUU's longtime news slogan. KTUU does not carry a midday or weekend morning newscast.

Following Gray's purchase of the non-license assets of KTVA, that station's news operation was inherited by KYES-TV (now KAUU); with its existing ownership of KTUU-TV, this gave Gray control of two news operations in the Anchorage market. On August 30, 2020, KTVA's news operation aired its final newscast from its facility. The next day, Gray launched Alaska's News Source, which hired 11 staffers from KTVA, and acts as a combined news operation for both KTUU and KYES. The combined newscasts began to air August 31, 2020.
 
KTUU has been the top-rated station in the Anchorage market for decades; its ratings for their newscasts helped make them one of the strongest NBC affiliates in the country and its newscasts routinely receive several times more viewers than its competition. The KTUU news team routinely wins regional and national awards and in 1999, became the first television station in Alaska with their own satellite uplink truck (NewsStar 2). The National Press Photographers Association named KTUU the Small Market Television News Photography Station of the Year in 2006, 2008 and 2010. In 2013, KTUU was also the first in Alaska to broadcast their news in high definition.

Notable former staff
 Chuck Henry – anchor (1967–1968, later at KNBC in Los Angeles; now retired)
 Sarah Palin – fill-in sports anchor; former Alaska governor and U.S. vice presidential candidate

Technical information

Subchannels
The station's digital signal is multiplexed:

Analog-to-digital conversion
KTUU-TV shut down its analog signal, over VHF channel 2, on June 12, 2009, the official date on which full-power television stations in the United States transitioned from analog to digital broadcasts under federal mandate. The station's digital signal remained on its pre-transition VHF channel 10. Through the use of PSIP, digital television receivers display the station's virtual channel as its former VHF analog channel 2.

Translators
KTUU-TV extends its over-the-air coverage through a network of translator stations.

Girdwood: 
Homer: 
Kasilof: 
Kenai: 
Ninilchik:

See also
 Hawaii News Now (a combined news operation for sister stations KGMB and KHNL in Honolulu, Hawaii)

References

External links
 

NBC network affiliates
Heroes & Icons affiliates
Start TV affiliates
Gray Television
Television channels and stations established in 1953
1953 establishments in Alaska
TUU-TV